The 2011–12 Hong Kong First Division League, also known as 2011–12 bma Hong Kong First Division League season was the 100th since its establishment. Kitchee SC was the defending champions, having won their 4th Hong Kong title in the previous season.

Teams

A total of 10 teams will contest the league, 8 of which already contested in the 2010–11 season and 2 of which will be promoted from the 2010–11 Hong Kong Second Division League.

Tai Chung was relegated to Second Division after ending a two-year tenure in First Division and HKFC was also relegated, making its immediate return to the second level after just one year in the Hong Kong top flight. The 2 relegated teams will be replaced by Sham Shui Po and Pontic from the 2010–11 Hong Kong Second Division League.

Fourway Rangers changed their name to Biu Chun Rangers.

Stadia

1As Mutual has withdrawn from 2011 to 2012 Hong Kong First Division League, Hong Kong Sapling is formed to replace.

Personnel and sponsorship
The 2011–12 season will continue to be sponsored by BMA Entertainment, a company owned by South China's convener Steven Lo. bma's sponsorship is worth HK$2 million. (approx US$250,000.) Of the HK$2 million, HK$1.2 million will be for the sponsorship of the Now TV Hong Kong football channel. The league winners will receive HK$500,000 prize money, while the 1st runner's up and 2nd runner's up will receive HK$200,000 and HK$100,000 respectively.

The referees' uniforms are sponsored by Lotto Sport Italia.

Television broadcast
For the 2011–12 season, Now TV's channel 634 will become the Hong Kong Football Channel. The first live broadcast of the season will be Kitchee vs Sun Hei SC on 3 September 2011. The production cost will be sponsored by the TV station and supported by HKFA and the clubs. Advertising revenues, after subtracting Now TV's costs, will be shared with HKFA. Now TV announced that the channel will be free to all Now TV subscribers. The production cost of the channel is about HK$40 million. Now TV hopes that the Hong Kong government will subsidise the channel in the future, because they will also broadcast Hong Kong's inter-school matches.

As Sun Hei has decided not to take part in the TV broadcast package, the HKFA has imposed four broadcast sanctions: No live home game broadcasts, no division of advertising revenues, no interviews or feature programmes of team personnel and no mention of their sponsors' names. Faced with these sanctions, Sun Hei's Chung Chi Kwong continued to say the club has the right to spend its resources the way they like and will not change its mind due to external influences.

League table

Positions by round

Fixtures and results

Round 1

Round 2

Round 3

Round 4

Round 5

Note: The match between Hong Kong Sapling and South China was played at Mong Kok Stadium.(Originally at Kowloon Bay Park)

Round 6

Round 7

Round 8

Round 9

Note: The match between Biu Chun Rangers and Kitchee was played at Mong Kok Stadium. (Originally at Tsing Yi Sports Ground)

Round 10

Round 11

Round 12

Round 13

Round 14

Round 15

Note: Matches between Citizen and Sham Shui Po and between Sunray Cave JC Sun Hei and Kitchee were held in January 2012.Note: The match between Biu Chun Rangers and TSW Pegasus was played at Mong Kok Stadium. (Originally at Tsing Yi Sports Ground)

Round 16

Round 17

Note: The match between Biu Chun Rangers and South China AA will be played at Mong Kok Stadium. (Originally at Tsing Yi Sports Ground)
 Due to unstable weather condition, the bma First Division League match between Citizen and HK Sapling which held at Mongkok Stadium tonight (4 May 2012) had been abandoned and rescheduled to 15 May 2012

Round 18

Season statistics

Top scorers

Hat-tricks

Scoring

 First goal of the season: Leung Tsz Chun for Sunray Cave JC Sun Hei against Kitchee (3 September 2011)
 Widest winning margin: 6 goals
 Kitchee 6–0 Hong Kong Sapling (25 September 2011)
 Highest scoring game: 10 goals
 TSW Pegasus 6–4 Citizen (17 March 2012)
 Most goals scored in a match by a single team: 6 goals
 Kitchee  Kitchee 6–0 Hong Kong Sapling (25 September 2011)
 Sham Shui Po  Sham Shui Po 2–6 Tuen Mun (23 October 2011)
 Kitchee  Biu Chun Rangers 2–6 Kitchee (8 January 2012)
 TSW Pegasus   TSW Pegasus 6–4 Citizen (17 March 2012)
 Most goals scored in a match by a losing team: 4 goals
 Citizen  TSW Pegasus 6–4 Citizen (17 March 2012)

Clean Sheets

Most Clean Sheets: 7
South China

Awards

Monthly awards

HKSPA Most Valuable Player of the Month

Keymansoho Best Eleven of the Month

References

Hong Kong First Division League seasons
1
Hong Kong